The Branch River is a river of New Zealand.

See also
List of rivers of New Zealand

References

Rivers of the Marlborough Region
Rivers of New Zealand